Isorhapontin is a stilbenoid. It is the glucoside of isorhapontigenin. It can be found in mycorrhizal and non-mycorrhizal roots of Norway spruces (Picea abies), in the bark of Picea sitchensis or in white spruce (Picea glauca).

References 

Stilbenoid glycosides
Phenol glucosides